Dorans is an unincorporated community in Coles County, Illinois, United States.

History
Dorans had its start in 1878 when the railroad was extended to that point. The community was named for Samuel A. Doran, the original owner of the town site. A post office was established at Dorans in 1898, and remained in operation until 1935.

References

Unincorporated communities in Coles County, Illinois
Unincorporated communities in Illinois